Allium elegans is a species of flowering plants. It is native to Tadzhikistan, Uzbekistan and Kirgizistan.

References

External links 

 Allium elegans at The Plant List
 Allium elegans at Tropicos
 Allium elegans at Kew Plant of the World

elegans
Plants described in 1917
Flora of Tajikistan
Flora of Uzbekistan
Flora of Kyrgyzstan